Pseudatemelia subgilvida is a moth of the family Oecophoridae. It was described by Walsingham in 1901. It is found on Corsica.

The wingspan is about 18 mm. The forewings are pale cinereous, evenly suffused with pale greyish fuscous. The hindwings are greyish.

References

Moths described in 1901
Amphisbatinae
Moths of Europe